Mattia Palazzi (born 31 January 1978 in Mantua) is an Italian politician.

He is a member of the Democratic Party and was elected Mayor of Mantua at the 2015 Italian local elections. He took office on 15 June 2015.

Palazzi was re-confirmed for a second term at the 2020 Italian local elections.

See also
2015 Italian local elections
2020 Italian local elections
List of mayors of Mantua

References

External links
 

1978 births
Living people
Mayors of Mantua
Democratic Party (Italy) politicians